Decatur County Courthouse may refer to:

Decatur County Courthouse (Georgia), Bainbridge, Georgia
Decatur County Courthouse (Indiana), Greensburg, Indiana
Decatur County Courthouse (Iowa), Leon, Iowa
Decatur County Courthouse (Kansas), Oberlin, Kansas